Hillsboro may refer to a number of places in Virginia:

Hillsboro, Albemarle County, Virginia also known as Yancey Mills
Hillsboro, King and Queen County, Virginia
Hillsboro, Loudoun County, Virginia

References